Eternity is the third album by the British rock band Anathema. It was released on 11 November 1996 through Peaceville Records.

Background

Eternity moves away from the death-doom style of Anathema's first two albums, featuring heavier use of keyboards and mostly clean vocals. It features a version of Roy Harper's track "Hope".

It is the last album with drummer John Douglas before his return to the band in 1998.

Track listing

Personnel

 Vincent Cavanagh – vocals, guitars
 John Douglas – drums
 Duncan Patterson – bass
 Danny Cavanagh – guitars, keyboards

Guest musicians
 Michelle Richfield – female vocals
 Les Smith – keyboards
 Roy Harper – spoken word on "Hope"

Production
 Porl Medlock – photography (band)
 Mez – cover art
 Jan Anderson – mastering
 Martin Wilding – engineering assistant
 Tony Platt – producer, engineering

References

1996 albums
Anathema (band) albums
Albums produced by Tony Platt
Peaceville Records albums